Sheindlin is a surname. Notable people with the surname include:

Jerry Sheindlin (born 1933), American author, television personality, and attorney, husband of Judy
Judy Sheindlin (born 1942), also known as Judge Judy, American female lawyer, former judge, television personality, producer, and author